is a Japanese anime series produced by Enoki Films and adapted from the original 1835 Hans Christian Andersen fairy tale "Thumbelina" by Akiyoshi Sakai. It premiered in Japan on TV Tokyo on September 30, 1992 and ran for twenty-six episodes until its conclusion on March 31, 1993.

The series was edited into an eighty-minute film and released in North America on VHS by Starmaker Entertainment in 1993. In 2006, Digiview Entertainment re-released the Starmaker film to DVD.

Plot 
Unable to control her mischievous young daughter Maya, an exhausted mother seeks the guidance of an old witch living on the edge of town.  The witch gives this mother a magical copy of the fairy tale "Thumbelina" and tells her to read this to Maya. Later, when her mother falls asleep, Maya shrinks and is pulled inside the world of the book. A good witch appears and tells her that she is in her mother's dream world and that in order to return to normal, she must find a way to wake up her mother. To do this, she must travel to a faraway southern land meet to the Crystal Prince, who will help her reach home.  During her journey Maya faces many trials and hardships; along the way she befriends members of the dream world, who band together to help her reach the land of the South.

Cast

Additional voices 
 Chelsea Terry
 Ryann Ashley
 Noel Johnson
 Pierce Walker
 Brandon Garrison
 Tyrone Rodriguez
 Clinton Rodriguez
Uncredited
 Barbara Goodson – The Human Witch and Bridesmaid #2
 Mona Marshall – The Frog Witch, Bridesmaid #1 and Bridesmaid #3
 Jan Rabson – Hobbit #2
 Doug Stone – Insect, Sea Creature, Hobbit #1 and Hobbit #3

Media 
Produced by Enoki Films and adapted from the original Hans Christian Andersen fairy tale Thumbelina by Akiyoshi Sakai, it premiered in Japan on TV Tokyo on September 30, 1992 and ran for twenty-six episodes until its conclusion on March 31, 1993.

The series was licensed for release in North America by Starmaker Entertainment, which released the series to VHS format under the name Thumbelina on December 16, 1993. The Starmaker release was heavily edited, with director Jim Terry reducing the series to an eighty-minute film. On May 9, 2006, Digiview Entertainment re-released the Starmaker version to Region 1 DVD as Thumbelina: A Magical Story. The full series is also licensed for regional language releases in Colombia by Centauro Comunicaciones and in Italy by Italia 1 which broadcast the Italian dub on its channel.

The series uses two pieces of theme music, one opening and one ending theme, both performed by Yuki Matsura.

Episode listing

References

External links 
 

1992 anime television series debuts
Anime and manga based on fairy tales
Adventure anime and manga
Fantasy anime and manga
Shōjo manga
Works based on Thumbelina
TV Tokyo original programming
Fiction about size change
Television shows based on works by Hans Christian Andersen